"Flat Baroque" is a song composed by Richard Carpenter in 1966, during his joint career with John Bettis at Disneyland. It lay dormant until 1970, when Carpenter and his sister, Karen Carpenter, appeared on a syndicated radio show, called Your Navy Presents. They performed a slow, jazzy version of the song with the oboe being the main star. Carpenter did not think of recording a studio version of the song for record release until 1972 with the release of the album, A Song for You. This cut is much faster than the Your Navy Presents version, and features the piano rather than the oboe. The song gained Richard a Grammy award nomination in 1972 for Best Instrumental Arrangement Accompanying Vocals. In April 1972, it was released as the B-side song to "It's Going to Take Some Time".

Personnel
 Richard Carpenterpiano, orchestration
 Karen Carpenterdrums
 Joe Osbornbass
 Earl DumlerEnglish horn
 Norm Herzbergbassoon

References

1966 songs
1972 singles
The Carpenters songs
Songs written by Richard Carpenter (musician)
A&M Records singles
Pop instrumentals